During the 1978-79 season Juventus competed in Serie A, Coppa Italia and European Cup.

Summary 

During summer Bearzot appointed his Blocco-Juve for the 1978 FIFA World Cup, therefore Dino Zoff, Scirea, Gentile, Cabrini, Cuccureddu, Benetti, Tardelli, Causio and Bettega, arrived with a surplus of matches for the 1978-79 campaign. The Incumbent League Champion was out of the League race in early stages against A.C. Milan of Liedholm and undefeated Perugia of Castagner.

In his seven year as Chairman, Boniperti made only one transfer in to the squad the defender Brio a loan ended from Pistoiese and future replacement of Morini. Meanwhile, manager Trapattoni closed his third season in the club with a disappointing third place in league only with the positive remark on 25 March 1979 by defeating local rivals Torino F.C. after a bad streak lasting five years.  The squad in European Cup was early eliminated in first round by Glasgow Rangers, after a lost match 0-2 at Hampden Park

The club closed the season clinching its sixth Coppa Italia ever after winning the Final against Palermo F.C. in Napoli classifying to the 1979-80 UEFA Cup Winners' Cup.

Squad

Transfers

Competitions

Serie A

League table

Results by round

Matches

Coppa Italia

Group stage- Group 1

Matches

Quarterfinals

Semifinals

Final

European Cup

First round

Statistics

Squad statistics

Players statistics

References

See also 
Blocco-Juve

Juventus
Juventus F.C. seasons